Miles Aylmer Fulton Barnett  (30 April 1901 – 27 March 1979) was a New Zealand physicist and meteorologist. Born in Dunedin, New Zealand, he studied in that country but obtained his PhD in the United Kingdom at the University of Cambridge. He worked there on the propagation of radio waves and the ionosphere. Later, he returned in New Zealand where he helped to the development of the Meteorological Office and became its director in 1939, just before the start of World War II. After the war, he participated to the transition between the International Meteorological Organization (IMO) and the new United Nations' World Meteorological Organization (WMO).

Biography 
Miles Barnett is born in Dunedin on 30 April 1901, the son of a surgeon. He attended school in Christchurch before going to the University of Otago, where he gained many scholarships in mathematics. In 1924, he graduated MSc with in mathematics and physics, writing a thesis about the equipment used by Professor Robert Jack in his experimental radio broadcasts of 1921 and 1922.

Barnett started his PhD at Clare College, Cambridge, in 1924. Sir Ernest Rutherford assigned him the study of the propagation of radio waves through what became known later as the ionosphere under the supervision of Edward Victor Appleton. He was awarded the diploma in 1927 and elected a fellow of the Institute of Physics in 1929.

In 1927, Barnett took part in a scientific expedition to Greenland and married in October of the same year. Returning to New Zealand, he worked at the Wellington head office of the newly established Department of Scientific and Industrial Research (DSIR) on a variety of problems connected with geophysics, seismology and radio research. In 1935 while in UK, Barnett was appointed to the New Zealand Meteorological Office (then a branch of the DSIR, now MetService) to develop aviation services. After his return, he trained staff, developed facilities, and prepared for trans-oceanic air services. In June 1939, he replaced Edward Kidson as director of the Meteorological Office.

During the Second World War, the Office was transferred to the Air Department and then to the Royal New Zealand Air Force (RNZAF). Barnett became a wing commander in charge of nearly 500 staff from the equator to the sub-antarctic islands. After the war, Barnett was involved in the creation of the World Meteorological Organization as New Zealand's permanent representative from 1951 until 1962. He was chairman of the national committee for the International Geophysical Year, and a member of the Carter Observatory Board and the Dominion Museum management committee. He became an RNZAF Reserve officer in February 1947, with the rank of group captain, and transferred to the Territorial Air Force from 1952 to 1962.

Miles Barnett retired from the Meteorological Service in July 1962. He died at Waikanae on 27 March 1979.

Awards 
In the 1945 King's Birthday Honours, Barnett was appointed an Officer of the Order of the British Empire (Military Division). In 1948, he was made and an officer of the US Legion of Merit in 1948.  In 1953, he was awarded the Queen Elizabeth II Coronation Medal.

In 1947, he was elected a fellow of the Royal Society of New Zealand and its president in 1964.

See also
 Ionosphere
 Edward Victor Appleton

References

1901 births
1979 deaths
New Zealand physicists
New Zealand meteorologists
Presidents of the Royal Society of New Zealand
Scientists from Dunedin
New Zealand Officers of the Order of the British Empire
University of Otago alumni